Marvin Travis Williams (born 12 August 1987) is an English former footballer who played as a winger and forward.

Williams began his career as a trainee at Millwall, progressing through the club's youth system. Williams made his first-team debut for Millwall during the club's 2005–06 season, signing his first professional contract in January 2006. He joined Torquay United on loan in March 2007 in an attempt to play regular first-team football, before returning to his parent club a month later. Williams played over 50 times for Millwall during his two years at the club. Ahead of the 2007–08 season, he signed for Yeovil Town for an undisclosed fee, and spent a season with the Somerset club.

He joined Brentford in June 2008 on a one-year contract, and helped the club achieve promotion to League One. Williams then joined Torquay United, this time on a permanent basis, but only made four appearances for the club, and was released in December 2009. A spell at Swedish Third Division club Östersund followed in April 2010, playing seven times before leaving the team in June that year. In October 2010, Williams briefly joined League Two club Stevenage on non-contract terms, but was released two weeks later.

Williams signed for Hemel Hempstead Town in early 2011, but soon returned to full-time football with Conference South club Salisbury City. In May 2012, he joined Eastleigh. Williams was released from his contract at Eastleigh just two months into the 2012–13 season and subsequently signed for fellow Conference South team Sutton United in October 2012. Williams was loaned out to Tonbridge Angels during the 2014–15 season. He retired from playing due to a persistent achilles problem in 2015.

Early life
Williams was born in Sydenham and educated at Addey and Stanhope School.

Career

Millwall
Williams began his career at Millwall at the age of 9 and progressed through the club's youth system. He made his first-team debut for the club on 10 December 2005, coming on as a late substitute for Jermaine Wright in a 1–0 defeat away to Coventry City. Williams scored his first professional goal on 2 January 2006, the winner in a 2–1 home victory against Derby County, controlling David Livermore's pass before beating Lee Camp in the Derby goal. Five days later, Williams signed his first professional contract with Millwall, just hours before the club's FA Cup tie against Premier League club Everton. Williams subsequently made his first start against Everton, scoring just before half-time in a 1–1 draw. He later described the goal as one of the highlights of his career. He scored his third goal for Millwall in the club's 2–1 victory against Luton Town at The Den on 4 March 2006. Williams' goal came in injury-time, one which was described as "priceless" due to Millwall's precarious league position. Williams played 24 games during the 2005–06 season, scoring five times as Millwall were relegated to League One.

He scored his first goal of the 2006–07 season on 26 August 2006, scoring with a "low shot" to give Millwall the lead against Cheltenham Town, although Millwall ended up losing the match 3–2. Williams went six months without scoring, ending his goal drought in Millwall's 2–1 away win at Oldham Athletic on 17 February 2007. After Williams was not included on the substitutes' bench in Millwall's 2–0 home win against Cheltenham Town on 3 March 2007, he requested to go out on loan in order to "start playing regular first-team football". Three days later, on 6 March 2007, Williams joined League Two club Torquay United on loan for the remainder of the season. He scored on his Torquay debut in a 3–0 home victory against Wycombe Wanderers on 10 March 2007. After playing twice for Torquay, Millwall took advantage of the clause that stated Williams could be recalled after 28 days when it was revealed that the club's top scorer Darren Byfield would be out for the rest of the season. He was recalled on 4 April 2007. Williams played 31 games for Millwall during the 2006–07 season, scoring three goals. Williams played 55 times for Millwall during his two-year association with the club, scoring eight times.

Yeovil Town
Ahead of the 2007–08 season, on 26 July 2007, Williams signed a two-year contract for Yeovil Town of League One for an undisclosed fee. On signing for Yeovil, Williams stated Yeovil manager Russell Slade "was really persistent and was the one that really came in and pushed for me. From there I always knew that I would join Yeovil". He made his debut for Yeovil in the club's 1–0 away loss to Huddersfield Town on 11 August 2007, playing the opening 74 minutes. Williams made just nine starting appearances for Yeovil during the season, an ankle injury sustained in training in September 2007 also meant he missed three months of first-team action. He played 24 times for Yeovil during the season.

Brentford
Williams joined League Two club Brentford on 27 June 2008, signing an initial one-year contract. He joined Brentford for a nominal fee, having had a year left on his contract at Yeovil. He made his debut in the club's first game of the season, a 1–0 loss away to Bury, playing 75 minutes of the match before being substituted for Moses Ademola. A week later, Williams provided assists for Nathan Elder and Charlie MacDonald in Brentford's 4–0 win against Grimsby Town. He scored his first goal for Brentford in the club's 2–2 Football League Trophy draw with Luton Town at Kenilworth Road on 7 October 2008, a game in which Brentford were beaten on penalties. He played a total of 37 times, scoring twice, during Brentford's successful 2008–09 season, as the club finished as League Two champions.

Shortly after the conclusion of the season, on 9 May 2009, Williams was transfer-listed by Brentford manager Andy Scott. The decision to transfer-list Williams was "agreed mutually" due to the player's first team chances being described as "limited" by Scott. Despite being placed on the transfer list, Williams remained at Brentford a month into the 2009–10 season, eventually leaving by mutual consent when he signed a six-month contract with Torquay United, the club he had previously spent time on loan with, on a free transfer. After four appearances for Torquay, Williams was released by the club in December 2009.

Östersunds FK
Williams fell foul of an FA rule which states that players cannot play for more than two clubs in one season – Williams had already made one six-minute substitute appearance for Brentford and also played on loan at Torquay United during the 2009–10 season. Due to this ruling, he had to look for first-team football either outside of the UK or within the non-League football pyramid.

He joined Swedish Third Division club Östersund in April 2010. He signed for the Swedish club after English manager Lee Makel contacted him, asking him to play for Östersunds on a short-term basis. He made his debut in Östersunds' 7–1 away win in the Swedish Cup second round against Umedalens IF on 11 April 2010. He played alongside other English players in the form of Joe Holt, Richard Offiong, and Jon Routledge during his time with Östersunds. Williams made his first league start the following week, playing the whole match in a 1–0 loss to Vasalunds IF. Williams went on to make nine appearances for the Swedish side, scoring his only goal in his last game for the club, a 1–1 draw with Valsta Syrianska IK on 5 June 2010. He left the Swedish club June 2010, describing it as "a really interesting experience culturally".

Return to England
The 2010–11 season meant that Williams was eligible to once again play in the Football League, and he subsequently featured for League Two club Stevenage's reserve team in September 2010. After a short trial period, he signed for the club on non-contract terms on 2 October 2010. On the same day as his signing was announced, Williams made his first-team debut for Stevenage in the club's 2–0 loss to Wycombe Wanderers, coming on as a 73rd-minute substitute in the match. Williams left the club after two weeks, having made one appearance.

He then joined Hemel Hempstead Town in February 2011 for the remainder of the 2010–11 season. He continued to play for Hemel until he was offered a full-time contract by Conference South club Salisbury City, which he signed on 14 November 2011. Salisbury manager Darrell Clarke commented on Williams' "experience and great pedigree" as being factors in the move, also noting that Williams was "delighted" to be back playing full-time football. A day after joining Salisbury, Williams scored two goals on his debut after coming on as a second-half substitute in a 4–3 defeat to Welling United. Williams scored his first ever professional hat-trick in Salisbury's 3–1 win over Sutton United on 21 April 2012, the club's last home league game of the 2011–12 season. He ended the season having scored 10 times in 28 appearances for the club.

Sutton United
Ahead of the 2012–13 season, Williams signed for Eastleigh, also of the Conference South, on an initial two-year contract. After making eleven appearances, scoring once in a 3–0 away win against Havant & Waterlooville, he was released from his Eastleigh contract in October 2012, and subsequently signed for Sutton United. Williams made his debut for Sutton in the club's 2–1 victory over Truro City on 27 October 2012, playing the first 75 minutes of the match before being replaced by Paul Telfer. He scored his first goal for Sutton on 1 January 2013, netting from a tight angle in the club's 2–0 away victory over Bromley. Having scored twice in his first five months at Sutton, Williams hit a rich vein of goalscoring form in April 2013 to end the 2012–13 season. This run included three separate braces in convincing victories against Farnborough, Hayes & Yeading United and Bath City respectively and meant that Williams ended the season with nine goals in seven matches, with Sutton narrowly missing out on a play-off place despite winning their last eight league games. In his opening season with the club, he scored 11 times in 30 matches. The following season, Williams was limited to 16 appearances due to injury, scoring once.

Having started the opening month of the 2014–15 season making six of his seven appearances for Sutton from the substitutes' bench, Williams was loaned out to Isthmian League Premier Division club Tonbridge Angels on a one-month deal in October 2014. The loan agreement was aimed to assist Williams in his recovery from long-term injury. He made his debut for Tonbridge in a 1–0 home defeat to Billericay Town on 8 November 2014, coming on as a 68th-minute substitute in the match. The loan deal was later extended for the remainder of the 2014–15 season, as he went on to make 25 appearances during his time at the club, scoring three times. This included a goal in a 2–2 draw with Dulwich Hamlet on 25 April 2015. It proved to be his final appearance as a persistent achilles problem that was present for the final two seasons of his career forced him to retire from playing.

Style of play
Williams was originally deployed as a striker when he first broke into the Millwall first-team in 2006. Towards the latter stages of the 2005–06 season he was often used as the second striker alongside Ben May, and would use his quick turn of pace to "cause opposition defences' problems". When Williams signed for Brentford in 2008, manager Andy Scott described him as "quick and direct", as well as saying "he can play wide on the right or up front – he has a lot of potential".

Coaching career 
In 2014, Williams established a football academy at Sutton United and his role entails overseeing "the programme, from coaching to taking matchdays, arranging the logistics of a game as well as organising fixtures and recruitment".

Personal life
In late 2010, he undertook a personal training course. Williams has two children.

Career statistics

A.  The "Other" column constitutes appearances and goals (including those as a substitute) in the Football League Trophy and FA Trophy

Honours
Brentford
 League Two: 2008–09

References

External links

1987 births
Living people
People educated at Addey and Stanhope School
People from Sydenham, London
English footballers
Millwall F.C. players
Torquay United F.C. players
Yeovil Town F.C. players
Brentford F.C. players
Östersunds FK players
Stevenage F.C. players
Hemel Hempstead Town F.C. players
Salisbury City F.C. players
Eastleigh F.C. players
Sutton United F.C. players
Tonbridge Angels F.C. players
English expatriate footballers
Expatriate footballers in Sweden
English expatriate sportspeople in Sweden
National League (English football) players
Isthmian League players
Association football forwards